William Kunpei Hosokawa (January 30, 1915 – November 9, 2007) was an American writer and journalist.

Of Japanese descent, while interned at the Heart Mountain Relocation Center, he was the editor of the internment camp's newspaper, The Heart Mountain Sentinel. After being freed from the camp in 1943, Hosokawa worked as a columnist and editor at The Denver Post for 38 years. He retired from the newspaper industry in 1992, at the age of 77.

Hosokawa was also a prolific author.  His best-selling book Nisei: The Quiet Americans (1969) chronicles the experiences of second-generation Japanese Americans, known as Nisei. Hosokawa published his final work, Colorado's Japanese Americans: From 1886 to the Present (2005), when he was 90 years old. His other books include Out of the Frying Pan (1998), Thirty-Five Years in the Frying Pan (1978), Thunder in the Rockies (1976), The Two Worlds of Jim Yoshida (1972), and The Uranium Age (1955).
  
Hosokawa was a recipient of the 2007 Civil Rights Award from the Anti-Defamation League.

Early life
Bill Hosokawa was born on January 30, 1915, in Seattle, Washington. His parents were recent immigrants from Japan. His father, Setsugo Hosokawa, who immigrated from Hiroshima, Japan, in 1899 at the age of 15, worked as a migrant farm worker and a railroad section hand in Montana. Hosokawa's parents eventually settled in Seattle.

Hosokawa graduated from Garfield High School in Seattle. He enrolled at the University of Washington, where he earned his bachelor's degree in journalism in 1937. In 1936, while a student at UW, Hosokawa's professor and adviser strongly recommended that he abandon his journalism career goals, because no newsroom would hire a  Japanese American.

Career
Hosokawa and his new wife, Alice Miyake, moved to Asia in 1938 because he was unable to land a job at any major metropolitan newspaper in the United States. He found a job working at an English-language newspaper in Singapore. He was later employed by a magazine in Shanghai, China.

Hosokawa's wife returned to the U.S. in anticipation of the birth of their first child. Hosokawa did not see his son, Michael, until the baby was 14 months old. The family lived in Seattle in 1941, just before the Japanese attack on Pearl Harbor. Soon after the attack, President Franklin D. Roosevelt signed Executive Order 9066. As a result, Bill Hosokawa, his wife, and the couple's infant son were among 120,000 Japanese Americans on the West Coast who were sent to Japanese internment camps during World War II.

The Hosokawa family was sent first to an assembly center at the Puyallup, Washington fairgrounds where the family, along with others from the Seattle area, lived in horse stalls while the camps were being built. The family was moved to the Heart Mountain Relocation Center in Wyoming when he was 27 years old. Hosokawa's later writings and news reports were influenced by his time spent interned with fellow second-generation Japanese Americans, who were known as Nisei, and their children, such as his son, who were known as Sansei. Since Hosokawa had journalism and writing experience, he was appointed the editor of the Heart Mountain Relocation Camp newspaper, The Heart Mountain Sentinel.

Hosokawa and his family were released from the internment camp in 1943, so he could work as a copy editor at The Des Moines Register. However, the experience of internment stayed with Hosokawa. For more than 40 years Hosokawa published a column in the Pacific Citizen entitled From The Frying Pan. His column offered his personal observations on the internment of Japanese Americans. His topics included bigotry and what he called "native fascism". His later entries sometimes focused on parenthood and travel, but he usually stayed on the topic of discrimination.

Hosokawa finally received a position with a major metropolitan newsroom after World War II, when he accepted a job with the Denver Post. He served as a war correspondent for the Denver Post during the Korean War and Vietnam War. He also worked at the Post as a columnist, associate editor, and assistant managing editor at the paper. He also held the post of the editor of the Denver Posts Sunday magazine for 25 years.

He left the Denver Post in 1984 and took a position as the reader ombudsman at the Rocky Mountain News, which was the archrival of the Denver Post. He remained with the Rocky Mountain News for eight years, until his retirement from the newspaper business in 1992.

Hosokawa worked to promote opportunities from Nisei and Sansei Japanese Americans during his career. He often helped Japanese Americans, as well as recent immigrants, find jobs and counseling. According to the Rocky Mountain News, Hosokawa once even gave away his living room couch to a couple who needed it. He also worked to promote positive Japan–United States relations. He served as the Honorary Consul General of Japan for Colorado from 1976 until 1999.

Career as a writer
Hosokawa's books and writings were deeply influenced by his experience as a Japanese American in the internment camps during World War II.  His first major work, Nisei: The Quiet Americans, which explored this experience, became a national bestseller when it was published in 1969. He also focused some of his writings on his love of newspapers.  His 1976 book, Thunder in the Rockies, chronicled the history of the Denver Post. His last book, Colorado's Japanese Americans: From 1886 to the Present, was published in 2005 when he was 90 years old.

Some of his writings were inscribed onto the National Japanese American Memorial in Washington D.C. when the monument was dedicated in 2000.

Books written by Bill Hosokawa

Nisei: The Quiet Americans (Paperback - April 2002)
Old Man Thunder: Father of the Bullet Train (Hardcover - Dec 1997)
Thunder in the Rockies: The Incredible Denver Post (Hardcover - 1976)
Colorado's Japanese Americans: From 1886 to the Present (Hardcover - October 30, 2005)
JACL: In Quest of Justice (Hardcover - Dec 1982)

Co-authored by Bill Hosokawa

They Call Me Moses Masaoka: An American Saga by Mike Masaoka and Bill Hosokawa (Hardcover - Sep 1987)
From Foe to Friend: One Man's Experience in Japanese/American Trade by Shinsaku Sogo and Bill Hosokawa (Hardcover - April 2002)
East To America A History of the Japanese in the United States by Robert A. Wilson and Bill Hosokawa (Hardcover & Paperback - 1980)

Honors
In 1987, Hosokawa received Japan's Order of the Rising Sun, Gold Rays with Neck Ribbon.

Hosokawa received on honorary Doctor of Humane Letters from the University of Denver in 1990 for his work in journalism and literature. In 2003, the  Asian American Journalists Association presented Hosokawa with its lifetime achievement award for his work. Hosokawa was a recipient of the 2007 Civil Rights Award from the Anti-Defamation League.

Additionally, the Japan Society of Colorado sponsors a fellowship in the name of Bill and Alice Hosokawa's name.

Death
Bill Hosokawa died on November 9, 2007, at the age of 92 at the home of his daughter, Christie Harveson, in Sequim, Washington, where he had lived for the previous four months. Hosokawa's wife, Alice, died in 1998, while his youngest son, Peter, died in 2006. He was survived by his two daughters, Christie and Susan, his son, Michael, his brother, Robert Hosokawa, as well as eight grandchildren and seven great grandchildren. In a column published in the Denver Post on November 22, 2007, Hosokawa's colleague Fred Brown called him a "champion of civility, dignity and human rights".

A memorial service for Bill Hosokawa was held at the Gates Concert Hall at the University of Denver on February 17, 2008. The list of speakers honoring Hosokawa included Colorado Governor Bill Ritter and Ryozo Kato, the Ambassador of Japan to the United States.

Ancestors

References

External links 
Rocky Mountain News: Champion of Japanese culture - and dignity
Seattle Times: Newsman Bill Hosokawa defeated bias, his own anger
Los Angeles Times: Bill Hosokawa, 92; journalist overcame internment and prejudice
Interview from Maynard Institute
Interview from Chips Quinn Scholars
Obituary from Denver Post columnist Fred Brown
2007 Article from Rocky Mountain News
Remembering Bill Hosokawa

1915 births
2007 deaths
American columnists
American newspaper editors
Japanese-American internees
American male journalists
American journalists of Asian descent
American writers of Japanese descent
Writers from Seattle
Writers from Denver
Garfield High School (Seattle) alumni
University of Washington College of Arts and Sciences alumni
The Denver Post people
Rocky Mountain News people
20th-century journalists
Recipients of the Order of the Rising Sun, 3rd class